Miguel Ângelo Loureiro de Carvalho (born 20 June 1996) is a Portuguese professional footballer who plays for S.C. Farense as a goalkeeper.

Football career
On 21 July 2018, Carvalho made his professional debut with Farense in a 2018–19 Taça da Liga match against Penafiel.

References

External links

1996 births
Living people
People from Faro, Portugal
Portuguese footballers
Association football goalkeepers
Segunda Divisão players
S.C. Farense players
Sportspeople from Faro District